Luke Handley is a fictional character from the Australian soap opera Neighbours, played by Bernard Curry. He made his first screen appearance during the episode broadcast on 7 March 1995. Luke's storylines included a brief fling with Libby Kennedy, a relationship with Serendipity Gottlieb, suffering a breakdown, being diagnosed with cancer and starting a relationship with Danni Stark. He departed on 17 December 1996, but Curry reprised the role in 2005 for the 20th anniversary.

Casting
In 1995, Curry was told his contract was not being renewed and his character was written out. However, the producers asked Curry to return seven weeks later and he accepted. In August 1996, it was announced that Curry had quit Neighbours for good. Curry said "I'm moving on because I just think I'd like to challenge myself further. I've got some big storylines coming up, but then I'll be leaving." He finished filming in October. Curry spent just over a year in total playing Luke. In 2005, it was confirmed that Curry would be reprising his role of Luke for a cameo appearance in the show's 20th anniversary episode "Friends for Twenty Years".

Development

Libby Kennedy
Shortly after he arrived in Erinsborough, Luke became attracted to his neighbour Libby Kennedy (Kym Valentine). However, since Libby was still at school, Luke fought off her obvious advances. But when Luke agreed to pose for some photographs taken by Libby, she threw herself at him and he realised that he could no longer resist her. Luke and Libby then began dating and she fell "head over heels" in love with him. Curry told Inside Soap's Jason Herbison "Libby had set her sights on Luke - she's fascinated by him, excited by his outspokenness. When they end up kissing one day Luke doesn't know what to do so he goes along with it, but to be honest I'm not sure that he's really convinced." When Libby's parents found out about her and Luke, they disapproved and became convinced that Luke was taking advantage of her. Luke then decided to put an end to the relationship because he did not see a future for them, which devastated Libby.

Serendipity Gottlieb

When Luke was hassled by some guys in The Coffee Shop, his housemate Serendipity Gottlieb (Raelee Hill) came over and helped him out. To thank her, Luke gave her a kiss and their "passion burns hotter than Luke's deep-fat fryer!" Hill stated "They end up falling into bed together that evening. When they wake up the next morning, they realise that their relationship has changed forever." Luke and Ren realised that they had to take things slowly because although Ren was certain about her feelings about for Luke, he was not so sure about her. When Ren suggested that they continue having sex together while seeing other people, it made Luke have serious doubts about their relationship. Hill believed that Luke found it hard to make a commitment to Ren because the death of his younger sister made him afraid to get close to anyone.

Luke and Ren's relationship remained on and off for a while, until he proposed to her. When Ren's brother Mark (Bruce Samazan) had an accident that left him in a coma, Luke made sure he was there to provide her with support. Ren became "increasingly distraught" about Mark and the only person who gave her a shoulder to cry on was Luke. The situation brought Ren and Luke closer together. Curry revealed "It's been up and down for a while, but now Luke realises how much he needs Ren. They do a lot of talking and realise they're deeply in love. That's when Luke asks Ren to marry him." Although the proposal was something Ren had been "dying to hear", she told Luke that she needed time to think about it. However, Luke was then offered a job in Japan. Curry commented "Luke lines up a job teaching English abroad. They will leave the show together, presumably to get married." Both Curry and Hill were written out of Neighbours, but Curry returned weeks later. Luke revealed that he had broken up with Ren while they were in Japan.

Storylines
Luke follows his sister, Jen (Alyce Platt), to Ramsay Street and moves in with Mark and Serendipity. He finds employment at The Holy Roll. He attracts the attention of Libby Kennedy, who uses him as a subject for her photography. Luke feels an attraction to Libby, but he knows that she is far too young for him and he tries to stay out of her way rather than tell her. Libby's father, Karl Kennedy (Alan Fletcher), learns of Libby's crush and he witnesses her kissing Luke in the Coffee Shop. He tells Luke to stay away from his daughter and Luke turns his attentions to Serendipity. They attempt to be a couple, but ultimately decide to be friends and Luke denies his feelings for her. However, Mark falls from a roof and ends up in a coma. After seeing how much pain Serendipity is in, Luke decides to propose to her. She accepts and they start planning their future, but that changes when Luke is offered a job teaching English in Japan. They decide to move to Japan together.

A few months later, Billy Kennedy (Jesse Spencer) notices strange noises around the community bus and it is revealed that Luke is back from Japan. Luke agrees to see Karl, who realises that Luke is having a breakdown after things with Serendipity had gone wrong. Luke eventually agrees to stay at the Robinson's until he is feeling better. Jen returns and Luke moves in with her and finds work as a timeshare salesman. Luke meets Kimberley Stevens (Rebecca Macauley) and she reveals that she is a policewoman. Their relationship falls apart after Kimberley leads a stakeout in Ramsay Street, during which Cody Willis (Peta Brady) is shot and killed. However, Luke decides to join the police force. Luke is happy to find a career that he likes and proceeds with the training. However, after a routine medical, Luke is told that he is suffering from non-Hodgkin's lymphoma. Luke immediately begins chemotherapy and he shaves his hair off. Luke's suffers from mood swings and at one point, he chooses to stop the chemotherapy. However, he is given hope by Charlie Moyes (Damien Bodie), a young boy he meets at a camp for terminally ill children.

Luke gets a lot of support from Debbie Martin (Marnie Reece-Wilmore) and Danni Stark (Eliza Szonert) and they invite him to live with them. Luke finds Debbie's attentions smothering and he seeks comfort in Danni. They begin a relationship, but Danni struggles to cope with Luke's condition. Debbie becomes upset at losing Luke and tries to win him over, but fails. Luke is thrilled when he is told that his cancer has gone into remission. He attempts to rebuild his life, but he feels that his condition is holding him back at job interviews. Danni is given a chance to further her fashion career in Malaysia for six months and she leaves. Luke becomes a shoulder to cry on for Joanna Hartman (Emma Harrison), Catherine O'Brien (Radha Mitchell) and Sarah Beaumont (Nicola Charles). He gives a talk at the school on surviving cancer and Susan Kennedy (Jackie Woodburne) encourages him to train as a teacher. Luke hears that Danni has been diagnosed with malaria and he flies to Malaysia. He and Danni settle down there and Luke completes his police training.

Reception
The cancer story was nominated for "Most Dramatic Storyline of the Last Year" and Curry for "Best Actor" at the 1997 Inside Soap Awards. A writer for the BBC's Neighbours website stated that Luke's most notable moment was "Posing as Sarah Beaumont's boyfriend when her ex visited from the UK." Matthew Clifton from Heckler Spray included Luke in his list of "The Best Ever Mid-90s Neighbours Characters". Clifton explained "Luke was actually a total dweeb who postured around the soap doing nothing, living in that weird house all the young randoms seem to be put in when they don't know what else to do with them. Luke had a cancer scare but even that didn't make him interesting. His only decent moment was when he 'haunted' the recreation centre, on a secret return from his apparent new life in Japan. Appearing at the end of an episode, when the haunting was supposed to be terrifying us, Luke stood on the roof of the rec's old open top bus and smoked a cigar nonchalantly, for no apparent reason." Jason Herbison from Inside Soap called Luke and Ren's relationship "the rockiest romance in Ramsay Street."

References

External links
Character profile at BBC Online
Character profile at the Internet Movie Database

Fictional Australian police officers
Neighbours characters
Television characters introduced in 1995
Male characters in television